Mellat Metro Station is a station in Tehran Metro Line 2.

Location
It is located in the junction of Ekbatan Street and Mellat Street. It is between Baharestan Metro Station and Imam Khomeini Metro Station.

References

Tehran Metro stations